Pandaka lidwilli, or the Lidwill's dwarf goby, is a species of goby found in brackish and salt water in the mouths of rivers and maritime zones in Japan, Australia, and Papua New Guinea. The specific name honours the Australian anesthesiologist and cardiologist Mark C. Lidwill (1878–1969), who was co-inventor of the pacemaker, as well as being a saltwater angler who, while fishing for game fish, observed this tiny goby and brought it to the attention of Allan Riverstone McCulloch who subsequently described it.

References 

Fish of Thailand
Taxa named by Allan Riverstone McCulloch
Fish described in 1917
Pandaka (fish)